Seamus Patrick Dever (born July 27, 1976) is an American actor known for his role as Detective Kevin Ryan in the ABC series Castle.

Early life 

Dever was born in Flint, Michigan, and moved at the age of six to Bullhead City, Arizona, where he grew up. He graduated as valedictorian of Mohave High School, completed his undergraduate studies at Northern Arizona University, and holds MFAs in Acting from the Moscow Art Theatre and Carnegie-Mellon University.

Personal life 

A lifetime member of the Actors Studio, Dever married the future Juliana Dever on May 27, 2006.  Juliana played Jenny Ryan, Ryan's wife, on Castle. He is a cousin of Broadway actress Jeanne Arnold and Canadian singer-songwriter Feist.

Dever and his wife are vegetarians. Both are also supporters of Best Friends Animal Society.

Dever also starred in a celebrity episode of the American version of The Chase, in Season 3 (2014), where he scored 11 questions in the preliminaries and led a team with Dean Cain to defeat the Chaser, Mark Labbett.

Filmography

Film

Television

Video games

References

External links 

 

1976 births
American male film actors
American male television actors
Actors Studio alumni
Carnegie Mellon University College of Fine Arts alumni
Living people
Northern Arizona University alumni
Actors from Flint, Michigan
20th-century American male actors
21st-century American male actors
People from Bullhead City, Arizona